Janss Marketplace is an outdoor shopping mall in Thousand Oaks, California. Previously known as Janss Mall, it opened in September 1961 as Village Lane. Conejo Valley Art Museum is also located here. It is home to well-known anchoring stores - Nordstrom Rack, and Old Navy. - along with specialty shops and fast food establishments. It has a nine-screen movie theater and is surrounded by neighborhood restaurants.

A big attraction here in the 1960s was its 854-seat Fox Conejo movie theater. The theater opened in May 1963 with a gala premiere of the movie A Gathering of Eagles (1963). Celebrities such as Lee J. Cobb, Barbara Eden, Gary Crosby and Annette Funicello attended the opening gala.

In 2015, Sears Holdings spun off 235 of its properties, including the Sears at Janss Marketplace, into Seritage Growth Properties.

The Reign of Terror Haunted House is located here, which is a  house open for tours on and around Halloween.

Toys "R" Us closed in June 2018.

On June 28, 2018, it was announced that Sears would be closing as part of a plan to close 78 stores nationwide. The store closed in September 2018. The former Sports Authority space became Dave & Busters that year.

References

Buildings and structures in Thousand Oaks, California
Shopping malls in Ventura County, California
Economy of Thousand Oaks, California
Shopping malls established in 1961